Harold Carter (29 March 1900 – 10 September 1973) was an Australian rules footballer in the Victorian Football League (VFL).

After three seasons with Fitzroy, Carter moved to Carlton at the start of the 1924 season. He left the club at the end of the 1928 season.

External links 

 Harold Carter at Blueseum
 
 

Carlton Football Club players
Fitzroy Football Club players
South Bendigo Football Club players
Australian rules footballers from Bendigo
1900 births
1973 deaths